"Elevator" is Flo Rida's overall second single (after "Low", which was from the soundtrack of the 2008 movie Step Up 2: The Streets), and the first single from Flo Rida's debut album Mail on Sunday. It was produced by Timbaland, who also features on the track. The piano intro features a melody based on the Halloween theme by John Carpenter and the second verse imitates the chorus of "The Donque Song" by will.i.am featuring Snoop Dogg. The song features Timbaland's signature percussion and vocals, as well as former Beatclub recording artist Kiley Dean on the background vocals. The song is similar in structure, key, and rhythm to the Timbaland-produced "4 Minutes" by Madonna featuring Justin Timberlake and Timbaland. The song was featured in the plot for the episode "Desperately Seeking Serena" of teen drama Gossip Girl.

Music video
The music video was directed by Gil Green and it premiered on February 17, 2008, featuring cameo appearances by DJ Khaled, Rick Ross, Brisco, Gunplay of Triple C's, Dre, Lil Boosie, Christina Milian and DJ Kronik..

Release history

Track listing
Maxi Single
 "Elevator [feat. Timbaland]" (Album Version) - 3:51
 "Low [feat. T-Pain]" (Travis Barker Remix) - 4:15
 "Gotta Eat" (Non-Album Track) - 3:53
 "Jealous" (Ray Seay Mix) (Explicit) - 4:06
 "Elevator [feat. Timbaland]" Video

Chart performance
In the U.S., "Elevator" debuted on the Billboard Hot 100 at #100. Soon after, it was released to iTunes, and managed to reach #4 on iTunes. Due to the fact, "Elevator" soared 72 spots the next week to #28 and then later peaked at #16. In New Zealand, the single peaked at #10 in its seventh chart week, making Flo Rida's second single in the RIANZ top 10. The track debuted on the Hot Digital Songs chart at #10 with 64,000 downloads. It has had moderate success on the Irish Singles Chart, peaking at 11 so far.

In Canada the song debuted made a "Hot Shot Debut" at number 12 on the Canadian Hot 100 on the issue of March 1, and then rose to number 10 the next week all based digital sales. In the UK, the song has been hanging around the Top 100 Singles for a couple of months and as of June 29, 2008, the song has peaked at number 20, which is very respectable because of the huge success of "Low".

In Australia, it peaked at 13 and has been certified Gold.

Weekly charts

Year-end charts

Certifications

References

2008 singles
Flo Rida songs
Song recordings produced by Timbaland
Timbaland songs
Songs written by Timbaland
Music videos directed by Gil Green
Songs written by Flo Rida
2007 songs